Doors open may refer to:

Doors Open, a 2008 novel by Ian Rankin
Doors Open (film), a 2012 Scottish adaptation of the novel, directed by Marc Evans
Doors Open Days, which enable free access to buildings not normally open to the public
The Doors Open, a 1949 novel by Michael Gilbert